List of games and video games from American toy company Mattel.

Games
 Angry Birds: Knock On Wood
 Apples to Apples (acquired from Out of the box Publishing)
 Atmosfear – The Harbingers
 Balderdash
 Bezzerwizzer
 Blink
 Blokus
 Bold
 Boom-O
 Bounce off
 Cinq-O
 Ever After High Charmed Style and Tea Party Dash
 Gas Out
 Ghost Fightin Treasure Hunters
 He-Man: Tappers of Grayskull
 Angry Birds: Knock On Wood
 Hot Wheels: Crash!
 KerPlunk (mobile)
 Kuuduk
Loopz (Includes Loopz Shifter and Loopz M3)
 Lie Detector

 Lowdown
 MAD GAB
 Magic 8 Ball (mobile)
 Monster High Minis Mania 
 Phase 10
 Pictionary
 The Power Glove for the Nintendo Entertainment System
 Thomas & Friends: Read & Play and Race On!
 Radica USA
 Othello (Reversi)
 Rhino Rampage
 Rock'em Sock'em Robots (mobile)
 Scene It?
 Skip Bo
 Snappy Dressers
 SnapShouts
 Sonar Sub Hunt (1961–?)
 Spider Pete's Treasure 
 Squawk
 Toss Across (mobile)
 Trickster
 Tumblin Monkeys
 Turnspell
 U.B. Funkeys (new product with new software to play new games)
 UNO
 DOS
 UNO Free Fall
 WHAC-A-MOLE
 Wizards Wanted

Video game consoles, home computers and handheld electronic games

 Intellivision
 Intellivision II
 Intellivision III (unreleased)
 Intellivision IV (unreleased)
 Aquarius
 HyperScan

See also
 List of Mattel toys

External links
Official Mattel website

Mattel